KTZN (Alaska's ESPN 550 The Zone) is a commercial radio station licensed to serve Anchorage, Alaska.  The station is owned by iHeartMedia, Inc.  Its studios are located at Dimond Center in Anchorage, and its transmitter is located off Dowling Road in Southeast Anchorage.

It is an affiliate of ESPN Radio.

References

External links

FCC History Cards for KTZN

1948 establishments in Alaska
ESPN Radio stations
IHeartMedia radio stations
Radio stations established in 1948
TZN